Jason Coleman (born 21 August 1974) is an Australian born cricketer.  Coleman is a right-handed batsman who bowls right-arm medium pace. He was born at Sydney, New South Wales .

Coleman made his List A debut for Huntingdonshire against Oxfordshire 2001 Cheltenham & Gloucester Trophy. He played two further List A matches for the county. These were against the Surrey Cricket Board in the same competition and the 1st round of the 2002 Cheltenham & Gloucester Trophy which was played in 2001. In his three List A matches, he scored 46 runs at a batting average of 46 and a high score of 26. With the ball he took 3 wickets at a bowling average of 35.33, with best figures of 1/26.

In 2003, Coleman joined Cambridgeshire, where he made his Minor Counties Championship debut for the county against Cumberland.  From 2003 to 2014, he represented the county in six Minor Counties Championship matches and five MCCA Knockout Trophy matches.

References

External links
Jason Coleman at Cricinfo
Jason Coleman at CricketArchive

1974 births
Living people
Cricketers from Sydney
Australian cricketers
Huntingdonshire cricketers
Cambridgeshire cricketers
Bedfordshire cricketers